Harry Bohrmann (born 26 March 1952) is a retired German football goalkeeper.

References

External links
 

1952 births
Living people
German footballers
Bundesliga players
VfL Bochum players
DSC Wanne-Eickel players
Association football goalkeepers